Natanael dos Santos Macedo, known as Macedo (16 December 1969) is a Brazilian former professional footballer.

Career

At the age of 12, Macedo started in the youth levels of Rio Branco Esporte Clube. He turned professional in 1990. That year, he shared the topscorer of the second level of São Paulo league with 14 goals. In January 1991, he had the pass bought by São Paulo, in a negotiation that totaled 550.000 dollars.

Macedo arrived in São Paulo FC at the age of 20, in 1990. He stood out in the club, having even been champion of the Copa Libertadores and the Intercontinental Cup. In the second game of the 1992 Copa Libertadores Final, against Newell's Old Boys, he entered the second half and suffered a penalty which was converted by Raí. The 1-0 result took the decision to penalties kicks, and São Paulo won the title.

One day, he arrived at São Paulo training with hair extensions, Rastafarian style. The manager Telê Santana didn't like the look at all and made the player undo the hairstyle.

When he left São Paulo in 1993, he went to play for Cádiz , but his time at the Spanish club was short-lived.

With stints in other traditional clubs, such as Santos FC, Cruzeiro EC, Vasco, Grêmio, Coritiba and Fortaleza EC, Macedo also played prominently in Ponte Preta, between 2000 and 2002 and in 2004. In the final part of his career, he defended EC Taubaté, Atlético Sorocaba, Comercial de Ribeirão Preto, Itabaiana and Operário, leaving the fields in 2009, at União Mogi, then in the Campeonato Paulista Série A3.

For the Brazil national team, he played 2 games between 1991 and 1992, not scoring any goals.

Honours

São Paulo FC
Campeonato Paulista
Winners (2): 1991, 1992
Campeonato Brasileiro
Winners: 1991
Copa Libertadores
Winners (2): 1992, 1993
Supercopa Libertadores
Winners: 1993
Intercontinental Cup
Winners (2): 1992, 1993

Santos FC
Torneio Rio-São Paulo
Winners: 1997

Grêmio FBPA
Campeonato Gaúcho
Winners: 1999
Copa Sul
Winners: 1999

References

1969 births
Living people
Association football forwards
Brazilian footballers
São Paulo FC players
Cádiz CF players
Santos FC players
Cruzeiro Esporte Clube players
Coritiba Foot Ball Club players
Grêmio Foot-Ball Porto Alegrense players
CR Vasco da Gama players
Associação Atlética Ponte Preta players
Campeonato Brasileiro Série A players
Campeonato Brasileiro Série B players
La Liga players
Brazil international footballers
Brazilian expatriate sportspeople in Spain